Players and pairs who neither have high enough rankings nor receive wild cards may participate in a qualifying tournament held one week before the annual Wimbledon Tennis Championships.

Seeds

  Jennifer Santrock (second round)
  Michelle Jaggard (qualified)
  Kim Steinmetz (first round)
  Debbie Graham (qualifying competition, lucky loser)
  Carin Bakkum (qualified)
  Catherine Suire (qualifying competition, lucky loser)
  Elizabeth Minter (second round)
  Nana Miyagi (first round)
  Kimiko Date (qualified)
  Lea Antonoplis (second round)
  Maria Lindström (second round)
  Maya Kidowaki (first round)
  Gisele Miró (qualifying competition, lucky loser)
  Christina Singer (qualifying competition)
  Marzia Grossi (second round)
  Alexia Dechaume (second round)

Qualifiers

  Kristine Radford
  Tracey Morton
  Kimiko Date
  Sandy Collins
  Jill Smoller
  Sophie Amiach
  Carin Bakkum
  Michelle Jaggard

Lucky losers

  Debbie Graham
  Catherine Suire
  Gisele Miró

Qualifying draw

First qualifier

Second qualifier

Third qualifier

Fourth qualifier

Fifth qualifier

Sixth qualifier

Seventh qualifier

Eighth qualifier

External links

1989 Wimbledon Championships on WTAtennis.com
1989 Wimbledon Championships – Women's draws and results at the International Tennis Federation

Women's Singles Qualifying
Wimbledon Championship by year – Women's singles qualifying
Wimbledon Championships